"Feelings" is a song by English singer John Newman. The song was released as a digital download on 8 March 2019 by Island Records. The song was written by Emma Bertilsson, Fredrik Haggstam, John Newman, Litens Anton Nilsson and Nirob Islam.

Background
Newman was ready to quit when "Olé" failed to chart back in 2016, he said, "I was on the phone to my manager and I was saying 'I want to give up. I'm done'. I wasn't releasing the kind of music I should have been and there were too many chefs in the kitchen. I was so sick of it." He describes the song as a return to 'sing-along bangers', he also said, "I never want to experience the feeling of having a flop again. I have to reconnect with people." The song then failed to chart in the UK.

Track listing

Personnel
Credits adapted from Tidal.
 Freddy Alexander – producer, associated performer, co-producer, programming
 Jarly – producer, co-producer
 John Newman – producer, composer, lyricist, associated performer, background vocalist, co-producer, vocals
 Emma Bertilsson – composer, lyricist
 Fredrik Haggstam – composer, lyricist
 Litens Anton Nilsson – composer, lyricist
 Nirob Islam – composer, lyricist
 Bill Zimmerman – assistant mixer, studio personnel
 Nana Maria Berqvist – associated performer, percussion
 Sharlene Hector – associated performer, background vocalist
 Vula Malinga – associated performer, background vocalist
 Phil Tan – mix engineer, studio personnel

Charts

Release history

References

2019 singles
2019 songs
Island Records singles
John Newman (singer) songs
Songs written by John Newman (singer)